Mr. Pizza Inc.  (Korean: 미스터피자) is a South Korean pizza chain established in 1990. It is the top pizza brand in Korea in terms of the number of franchisees and sales.

Mr. Pizza has won recognition overseas. In 2009, 2010 and 2011 China's restaurant review site Dazhong Dianping (大衆點評) included it as one of the "50 Restaurants Beloved by Chinese Diners", while the restaurant guide Zagat named it the "Best Pizza Store".

Mr. Pizza was the first pizza franchise to be listed on KOSDAQ and, in 2013, had 400 outlets inside Korea and 28 stores in China, two in the United States and two in Vietnam. In 2010, the brand of Mr. Pizza in Japan was also fully acquired.

Overview

The founder and chairman of Mr. Pizza is Jung Woo Hyun (정우현) and the CEO and president is Moon Young Joo (문영주).

MPK Group was listed on KOSDAQ in August 2009 from Korea Pizza Corporation.

New store identity
Mr. Pizza developed a new store identity to strengthen its foothold in the global market and unveiled it at the opening of a Fuzhoulu location in Shanghai in March 2013.

Advertising
Mr. Pizza's September 2011 mockumentary-style commercial, "The True Origins of Pizza", had more than a million views on YouTube. It received high praise and in-depth analysis in a journal article by two New Zealand-based Asian studies professors. They stated that "the level of skill and irony that went into its making is noteworthy among commercial ads anywhere".

MPK Group Inc.
MPK Group Inc. is a restaurant company with a selection of premium brands including "Mr. Pizza", a handmade muffin and coffee franchise, "Manoffin", and "Jessica's Kitchen" Italian buffet restaurants.

References

External links
Mr. Pizza Homepage (Mr.Pizza / 미스터피자 :: 1577-0077) 
Mr. Pizza blog 

Pizza chains of South Korea
Pizza franchises
Restaurants established in 1990
South Korean companies established in 1990
Regional restaurant chains in the United States